The Crucifer of Blood is a play by Paul Giovanni that is adapted from the Arthur Conan Doyle novel The Sign of the Four. It depicts the character Irene St. Claire hiring the detective Sherlock Holmes to investigate the travails that her father and his three compatriots suffered over a pact made over a cursed treasure chest in colonial India during the Indian Rebellion of 1857.

Broadway production
The play, directed by the author, opened on Broadway at the Helen Hayes Theatre on September 28, 1978, and ran for 236 performances.

The production was nominated for four Tony Awards, including Giovanni for Best Direction of a Play, and won the award for Roger Morgan's lighting design. It also received Drama Desk Awards for Morgan as well as for John Wulp's scenic design. Bran Ferren received the Los Angeles Drama Critics Circle award for Special Visual & Sound Effects.

Cast
Paxton Whitehead - Sherlock Holmes
Glenn Close - Irene St. Claire
Christopher Curry - Jonathan Small
Andrew Davis - Mohammed Singh & Mordecai Smith
Martin LaPlatney - Hopkins
Timothy Landfield - John Watson, M.D.
Melvin Lum - Fung Tching, A Chinaman
Tuck Milligan - Wali Dad & Birdy Johnson
Roumel Reaux - Tonga
Dwight Schultz - Major Alistair Ross
Nicolas Surovy - Captain Neville St. Claire
Edward Zang - Durga Dass & Inspector Lestrade

London production
The play, directed by the author, opened in London at the Theatre Royal Haymarket on March 15, 1979, and ran for 397 performances. Denis Lill who played Dr. Watson, would later go on to play Inspector Bradstreet in Sherlock Holmes (1984 TV series).

Cast
Keith Michell - Sherlock Holmes
Susan Hampshire - Irene St. Claire
Nicholas Day - Jonathan Small
Geoffrey Snell - Mohammed Singh & Mordecai Smith
James Curran - Hopkins
Denis Lill - John Watson, M.D.
Klim Leh T'Chei - Fung Tching, a Chinaman
Billy McColl - Wali Dad & Birdy Johnson
Reis Etan - Tonga
John Quentin - Major Alistair Ross
Edward Petherbridge - Captain Neville St. Claire
John Cater - Durga Dass & Inspector Lestrade

Los Angeles production
The play, directed by the author, premiered in Los Angeles at the Ahmanson Theatre in the Los Angeles Music Center on December 5, 1980, and ran through January 17, 1981. A notable feature of this production was that Jeremy Brett, who later became one of the most famous portrayers of Sherlock Holmes, played Dr. Watson.

Cast
Charlton Heston - Sherlock Holmes
Jeremy Brett - John Watson, M.D.
Suzanne Lederer - Irene St. Claire
Christopher Curry - Jonathan Small
J. Christopher O'Connor - Mohammed Singh
Richard Denison - Hopkins
Liu Han T'Seng - Fung Tching, a Chinaman
Ronald Dennis - Tonga
Dwight Schultz - Major Alistair Ross
Ian Abercrombie - Durga Dass & Inspector Lestrade
Alan Coates - Captain Neville St. Claire
Tuck Milligan  - Wali Dad & Birdy Johnson
C. Edward Pogue - Mordecai Smith

Film
The play was filmed for Turner Network Television and first broadcast on November 4, 1991. The cast featured Charlton Heston as Holmes, Richard Johnson as Watson, Clive Wood as Small, John Castle as St. Clair, Edward Fox as Ross, Simon Callow as Inspector Lestrade, Susannah Harker as Irene St. Claire, Stefan Kalipha as Wali Dad, Kaleem Janjua as Durga Das, Lloyd McGuire as Kiran Shah, Sidney Livingstone as Roly Lamas Dir, and James Coyle as Birdy Johnson. It was directed by Heston's son Fraser Clarke Heston.

References

External links

American plays
Works based on Sherlock Holmes
Sherlock Holmes films
Plays based on novels
Broadway plays
1978 plays
Television series produced at Pinewood Studios
Films directed by Fraser Clarke Heston